Landmarks in Perth comprise human-made structures, or natural features that command the horizon physically, or the cultural landscape, usually by historical or political significance.

CBD
 Barracks Arch – At the west end of St Georges Terrace, symbolic historically due to the position between Parliament House and St Georges Terrace.  It was the last remaining part of a large government building that was removed for the construction of the freeway just west of the Arch.
 108 St Georges Terrace – Features on the horizon when viewing Perth from distance, amongst a cluster of buildings that exist within the CBD.
 Central Park Tower – The tallest skyscraper in Perth.
 Council House – restored high modernist skyscraper set in the Stirling Gardens
 Elizabeth Quay
 Kings Park – A surviving piece of bushland adjacent to the city, with statues and war memorials.
 Narrows Bridge – a major traffic bridge crossing the Swan River
 Perth Arena – Entertainment and sporting arena.
 Perth Convention Exhibition Centre, located in the CBD
 Perth Mint – Australia's oldest operating mint, established in 1899 to mint gold sovereigns for the British Empire
 Perth Town Hall – The only convict-built town hall in Australia, built between 1868 and 1870.
 Perth Water – A much reduced corner of the Swan River with land infill on both north and south shores over the duration of a hundred years
 Swan Bells – At the foot of Barrack Street, this very recent construction contains significant historic bells.
 Western Australian Museum
 Yagan Square

Fremantle

 Esplanade Park, Fremantle
 Fremantle Arts Centre
 Fremantle Fishing Boat Harbour
 Fremantle War Memorial
 Fremantle Prison
 Fremantle Town Hall
 Fremantle Railway Station
 Fremantle Port Authority building – the tallest building in Fremantle
 Round House – built in 1830, and used as a prison for colonial and indigenous prisoners until 1886
 Western Australian Maritime Museum on Victoria Quay
 Victoria Quay, Fremantle

Metropolitan area
 Burswood Entertainment Complex – on the top of what was originally a swampy dump, a complex of international standard hotel, casino and other facilities
 Houghton Winery – historic Swan Valley winery established in 1836
 Lincoln Street Vent –  a ventilation shaft in Highgate
 Mount Henry Peninsula – Peninsula on the edge of Canning river near Mount Henry Bridge
 The Old Mill – Built in 1835, this is Perth's best-known historic landmark
 Perth Zoo in South Perth surrounded by expensive real estate this sanctuary for exotic and native wildlife has been re-invented a number of times since it was founded
 Rottnest Island – A holiday island  from Fremantle

See also
 Tourism in Perth

References

Lists of buildings and structures in Western Australia
 
Landmarks
Lists of landmarks
Lists of tourist attractions in Western Australia
Lists of tourist attractions in Australia by city